The 2020–21 Perth Glory FC season was the club's 24th season since its establishment in 1996. The club participated in the A-League for the 16th time. The club did not compete in the 2020 FFA Cup due to the event being cancelled following the COVID-19 pandemic in Australia.

Players

Current squad:

Transfers

Transfers in

From youth squad

Transfers out

Contract extensions

Pre-season and friendlies

Competitions

Overview
{|class="wikitable" style="text-align:left"
|-
!rowspan=2 style="width:140px;"|Competition
!colspan=8|Record
|-
!style="width:30px;"|
!style="width:30px;"|
!style="width:30px;"|
!style="width:30px;"|
!style="width:30px;"|
!style="width:30px;"|
!style="width:30px;"|
!style="width:50px;"|
|-
|A-League

|-
!Total

A-League

League table

Results summary

Result by round
Updated to match(es) played on 5 June 2021. Source: ultimatealeague.comH = Home; A = Away; B = Bye; W = Win; D = Draw; L = Lose

Matches

References

Perth Glory FC seasons
2020–21 A-League season by team